Grand Central Records was an independent record label based in the Northern Quarter of Manchester, England. It was started in 1995 by DJ Mark Rae (who, along with Steve Christian makes up the duo Rae & Christian). Rae started out working as manager of the Fat City Records' store (which is now also a record label). The two labels maintained a close relationship, co-hosting club nights including Friends and Family.

Grand Central also had a digital sub-label, GC3.

As of May 2006, Grand Central Records ceased operating as a record label and the official website was closed down. The label was allegedly investigated by the MCPS with regard to unpaid royalties and the resultant bill was so large that it forced the label into liquidation.

Artists
Aim
ARP
Boca 45
Broadway Project
Dual Control
Fingathing
Funky Fresh Few
Ill Gotten Gains
Jon Kennedy
Kate Rogers
Kohei Mihara
Mark Rae
Niko
Only Child
QNC
QNC are New York hip hop artists, QBall and DJ / producer Curt Cazal. Originally members of J.V.C. F.O.R.C.E (Justified By Virtue For Obvious Reasons Concerning Entertainment), QNC later collaborated with Rae & Christian and Aim. Their debut album, Duo Dynamic, was released in 2005.
Rae & Christian 
Riton
Rob Smith
The Nudge
The Nudge is Christian Wood (aka Woody), a DJ from Salford, Greater Manchester, signed to Grand Central Records by Mark Rae.
He only released a couple of 12" singles under the name The Nudge – Bumpin'  and Quickness (feat. The Rusty Pelicans aka The Rusty Ps), although further tracks and remixes appear on the Grand Central albums, Grand Central Vol. 1, Grand Central Vol. 2, Grand Central Translation, Grand Central Vol. 3 and Underground Crown Holders.
Tony D
Veba
Veba is a singer from Old Trafford, Manchester. She provided vocals on several songs for other Grand Central artists' records, including Mark Rae, Tony D, Fingathing, Only Child and most notably, Rae & Christian. An album containing several of her appearances, Veba Vs Grand Central was released in 2005.

After Grand Central
Aim left Grand Central Records in early 2005 and formed his own record label, ATIC Records, in June 2006 and released his label debut Flight 602 later the same year. Niko has also signed to ATIC Records, along with Gripper and Paperboy.
Boca 45 released his second album, Vertigo Sounds, on German record label Unique Records in 2006.
Fingathing released an EP, Apocalypso in 2006 from their own website. Subsequent releases have been on MP3 only, via the "Artists First" internet label. DJ Sneaky has since recorded solo, releasing a digital 4-track EP, with an album to follow, entitled Feel Like a King... Pluck a String.
Jon Kennedy released a 12" single, Demons in 2007 on his new label, The Jon Kennedy Federation.
Mark Rae initially started a new recording partnership with Rhys Adams in 2005, under the name ARP (Adams.Rae.Productions). In 2007, the pair started a new record label, Yes King Recordings and a new band, Yes King. Veba appeared amongst the vocalists on the Yes King album, Rock This World (2008). Future solo releases from Mark Rae and from Rae & Christian are also expected to be released on the new label.
The Nudge followed Aim to ATIC Records, and now records under the name Crowhead.
Riton has released several 12" singles on different European labels, and has also released an eponymous album under the recording name Eine Kleine Nacht Musik.
Rob Smith released two 12" singles, Give Love (2006) and Loveage (2007) on Functional Breaks.

Grand Central Records compilation albums

See also
 Lists of record labels
 List of electronic music record labels
 Grand Central Records compilations
 ATIC Records

References

External links

Electronic music record labels
British independent record labels
Record labels established in 1995
Defunct companies based in Manchester
Music in Manchester
British hip hop record labels